Scolopendra pinguis is a species of centipede in the subfamily Scolopendrinae that is endemic to Southeast Asia.

Appearance 
Scolopendra pinguis is small, growing around 6.4 cm in length. Its antennae are blue and hairless at the base, fading to pale blue and covered with fine, short hairs. They have 17 articles.

Colour morphs 
Pocock initially described S. pinguis as "of a deep uniform olivaceous tint", but a 2015 paper described four colour morphs that can be separated into a blackish monocromatic population and a dichromatic blue/yellow one, which are presented below:

References for information in table:.

References 

pinguis
Animals described in 1891